Yelgino is a rural locality (a village) in Podlesnoye Rural Settlement, Vologodsky District, Vologda Oblast, Russia. The population was 12 as of 2002.

Geography 
Yelgino is located 24 km southeast of Vologda (the district's administrative centre) by road. Melnikovo is the nearest rural locality.

References 

Rural localities in Vologodsky District